Trevor Pyke (1932 – 1997) was a British sound engineer. He was nominated for an Academy Award in the category Best Sound for the film Das Boot.

Selected filmography
 Das Boot (1981)

References

External links

1932 births
1997 deaths
British audio engineers